Monsempron-Libos is a railway station in Monsempron-Libos, Nouvelle-Aquitaine, France. The station is located on the Niversac - Agen railway line. The station is served by TER (local) services operated by SNCF. The station was also on the Monsempron-Libos - Cahors railway line, which is now closed.

Train services
The following services currently call at Monsempron-Libos:
local service (TER Nouvelle-Aquitaine) Périgueux - Le Buisson - Monsempron-Libos - Agen

Gallery

References

Railway stations in France opened in 1863
Railway stations in Lot-et-Garonne